Shigetoshi (written: 茂利, 滋利, 繁俊, 重憲 or 重俊) is a masculine Japanese given name. Notable people with the name include:

, Japanese footballer
, Japanese baseball player, writer and television personality
Shigetoshi Miyazaki (died 1942), Imperial Japanese Air Force officer
, Japanese sprinter
, Japanese sport shooter
, Japanese businessman and banker

Japanese masculine given names